Exomilus edychrous is a species of sea snail, a marine gastropod mollusk in the family Raphitomidae.

Description
The length of the shell varies between 3 mm and 4.1 mm; its diameter 1.1 mm.

(Original description) The small, solid, shell is subcylindrical. The shoulder is sloping, the body perpendicular, the base excavate, sharply angled at base and shoulder. The colour of all specimens seen are faded, but appear to have been buff, the protoconch and spots on the lower whorls darker, the basal keel white. The teleoconch contains three whorls. The protoconch consists of 3½ whorls, of which the first is turbinate, slightly tilted and engraved with microscopic spirally punctured lines, followed
by two transitional whorls keeled at periphery, and ornamented by fine close obliquely radiating riblets. The adult sculpture : on the body whorl, fifteen spiral cords, of which the third and eighth are prominent, expressing the angle above and below the barrel of the whorl, the basal cords are broken into beads. The penultimate whorl shows six, and the antepenultimate with three spirals. Broader than the spirals are the perpendicular radials, fourteen on the body whorl, and proportionately fewer on the rest. Commencing at the suture and vanishing on the base, they raise tubercles at the intersection of the spirals. The resulting meshes enclose deep pits in which is a microscopic shagreen surface. The aperture is contracted, straight above, flexed below, fortified by a broad strong varix, out of which a deeply notched subcircular anal sulcus is excavated. The spiral sculpture traverses the varix. Within the outer lip are four tubercles. The inner lip is excavate. The siphonal canal is short and broad.

Distribution

References

 Hervier, J 1897. Descriptions d'espèces nouvelles de Mollusques, provenant de l'Archipel de la Nouvelle-Calédonie (suite). Journal de Conchyliologie 44: 138-151 
 Powell, A.W.B. 1966. The molluscan families Speightiidae and Turridae, an evaluation of the valid taxa, both Recent and fossil, with list of characteristic species. Bulletin of the Auckland Institute and Museum. Auckland, New Zealand 5: 1–184, pls 1–23 
 Kilburn, R. N. 2009. Genus Kermia (Mollusca: Gastropoda: Conoidea: Conidae: Raphitominae) in South African waters, with observations on the identities of related extralimital species. African Invertebrates 50(2): 217-236

External links
  Fedosov A. E. & Puillandre N. (2012) Phylogeny and taxonomy of the Kermia–Pseudodaphnella (Mollusca: Gastropoda: Raphitomidae) genus complex: a remarkable radiation via diversification of larval development. Systematics and Biodiversity 10(4): 447-477
 
 MNHN, Paris: Exomilus edychrous (syntype in the MNHN, Paris)
 
 Moretzsohn, Fabio, and E. Alison Kay. "HAWAIIAN MARINE MOLLUSCS." (1995)

edychrous
Gastropods described in 1909